The In-Ko-Pah Mountains are one of the Peninsular Ranges located near the U.S. border with Mexico in southern California, west of the Jacumba Mountains. The range, which lies in a north-south direction, is located just north of Interstate 8, and east of the Manzanita Indian Reservation.

Geology
The In-Ko-Pah Mountains consist of faulted granitic intrusive bedrock, weathered into dramatic piles of residual boulders. The local granodiorite is naturally a very light color, weathering over centuries into a reddish-orange desert varnish.

Visitors can view these landforms while driving Interstate 8 through Devil's Canyon heading west and In-Ko-Pah Gorge heading east. Remnants of Highway 80, the first North American transcontinental highway, can be seen on either side. The boulders can be examined closer at the Desert View Tower, a historic roadside structure, that includes a boulder park with a number of massive Depression-era sculptures carved in the local rocks.

Camping among the rocks is available in the McCain Valley Recreational Area, located off Interstate 8 near the town of Boulevard.

See also
Peninsular Ranges topics

References

External links
 McCain Valley Recreational Area information
 Historic Desert View Tower — information.

Peninsular Ranges
Mountain ranges of the Colorado Desert
Mountain ranges of San Diego County, California